Babar Masih is a Rawalpindi-based Pakistani amateur snooker player who represents Pakistan in different international tournaments.

Masih is one of Pakistan's top-ranked amateur cueists. He belongs to a Christian family.

In August 2017, Masih and Muhammad Asif representing Pakistan-2 defeated Muhammad Sajjad and Asjad representing Pakistan-1 to win the IBSF World 6-Red Team Championship.

In August 2018, Masih was the runner-up in the 10th National Bank of Pakistan (NBP) ranking snooker championship losing 8–6 to Mohammad Ijaz in the final.

In September 2018, Masih won the Jubilee Insurance Ranking Snooker Championship 2018 by defeating Asif Toba 8–5 in the best of 15-frame final. Later in September, Masih along with Muhammad Asif won the Asian Team Snooker Championship held in Doha, Qatar, by defeating India's Pankaj Advani and Malkeet Singh 3–2 in the final.

Performance and rankings timeline

Amateur finals: 1

References 

Living people
Pakistani Christians
Pakistani snooker players
Sportspeople from Rawalpindi
1986 births